This a listing of fastest swimming times achieved at the Central American and Caribbean Games (CACs). All times are swum in a long-course (50m) pool.

These records are maintained by CCCAN, which oversee the swimming portion of the CACs.

Men

Women

Mixed

See also
Central American and Caribbean Swimming Championships
List of Americas records in swimming
List of South American records in swimming

References

Central American and Caribbean Games
Records
Records
Swimming